Querandiornis romani was a species of Tinamid bird that lived during the Pleistocene.

References

Pleistocene birds
Tinamiformes
Fossil taxa described in 1958